Nhan Phan-Thien, Fellow of the Australian Academy of Science (born October 31, 1952, in AnGiang, Vietnam), is a professor of mechanical engineering at the National University of Singapore, Singapore. He has been an associate editor of Physics of Fluids since 2016, and an editorial board member of Journal Non-Newtonian Fluid Mechanics. He held a Personal Chair at 
University of Sydney [1991-02] and head of the Mechanical Engineering Department National University of Singapore [2016–19]. His contribution to the rheology field includes the PPT (Phan-Thien – Tanner) model for viscoelastic fluid (1084 citations) and its variant (469 citations). He is the author and co-author of several books in rheology

Education
Phan-Thien graduated from the University of Sydney, Sydney Australia, with a BEng (Mech. Eng. 1st Honours, University Medalist, 1975). He later completed a PhD degree at the University of Sydney, the Department of Mechanical Engineering in 1979.

Career
He has been a faculty member in mechanical engineering at University of Newcastle (Australia) (1978–80) and at the University of Sydney, Sydney, Australia (1980–02). At the University of Sydney, he held a personal chair (1991–02). He was a professor of mechanical engineering at the National University of Singapore, Singapore (2000–04, 2011–present). He was the founding chair in Bio-Engineering Division, which later becomes known as Biomedical Engineering Department at the National University of Singapore. He has held visiting professorships in Los Alamos National Laboratory, New Mexico, US, Caltech, California, US, and Stanford University, California, US, a Qiushi Chair Professor at Zhejiang University, Hangzhou, China, an adjunct professor at the University of Southern Queensland, Queensland, Australia, and an honorary professor at the University of Sydney, Sydney, Australia.

Research
Phan-Thien and his group have published extensively on the rheology of polymeric liquids, computational and constitutive modelling.

Honours and awards
Qiushi Chair Professor, Zhejiang University (2018–21); 
Fellow of the ASEAN Academy of Engineering and Technology (elected 2016);
Fellow of the Australian Academy of Science (elected 1999);
Centenary Medal, awarded by the Governor General of Australia for services to Australian society and science in mechanical engineering (2001);
Gordon Bell Prize, Price-Performance category, IEEE Computer Society (1997);
Australian Society of Rheology Medal, awarded by the Australian Society of Rheology for distinguished contributions to Rheology (1997);
Edgeworth David Medal, awarded by the Royal Society of New South Wales, for distinguished research in science amongst younger workers in Applied Mechanics (1982);
Senior Fulbright Scholar (1982–83), California Institute of Technology, California, USA.

Books
Understanding Viscoelasticity: Basics of Rheology (Advanced Texts in Physics), Springer; 1st Edition 2002, 2nd Edition 2008,
Understanding Viscoelasticity: An Introduction to Rheology (Graduate Texts in Physics), 3rd Edition with  Nam Mai-Duy 2017, Springer,
Understanding Viscoelasticity: An Introduction to Rheology (Graduate Texts in Physics), 2nd Edition  2013, Springer,
Microstructures in Elastic Media: Principles and Computational Methods, 1st Edition with Sangtae Kim 1994, Oxford University Press,
Numerical Study on Some Rheological Problems of Fibre Suspensions: Numerical Simulations of Fibre Suspensions,  with Xijun Fan and Roger I. Tanner 2008, VDM Verlag Dr. Müller.

References

External links
 Research Group Homepage
 Google Scholar Page

Academic journal editors
American mechanical engineers
Living people
University of Sydney alumni
Rheologists
Fluid dynamicists
American materials scientists
1952 births
Australian materials scientists
Australian mechanical engineers